Juan Carlos Henao Valencia, usually known as Juan Carlos Henao (born December 30, 1971), is a Colombian retired footballer who played as a goalkeeper.

Career
As Once Caldas goalkeeper, in 2003, he won the Colombian Torneo Apertura, and in 2004, he won the Copa Libertadores and was runner-up of the Intercontinental Cup. He has been capped nine times for the Colombia national team. In 2004, Henao finished in the fifth place in the Uruguayan El Pais' South American Player of the Year award, after collecting 32 votes, and in the eighth place in IFFHS's World's Best Goalkeeper, with 29 points, tied with Portuguese goalkeeper Vítor Baía. He signed a one-year contract with Santos on January 3, 2005.  Juan Carlos Henao joined Real Cartagena on February 3, 2009. He returned to Once Caldas on June 23, 2010.

Transfer controversy
He joined Santos on free transfer on January 3, 2005, and his former club Once Caldas started a lengthy legal battle to claim the transfer fee. It was rejected by FIFA Dispute Resolution Chamber on February 26, 2010.

References

1971 births
Living people
Association football goalkeepers
Colombian footballers
Footballers from Medellín
Categoría Primera A players
Once Caldas footballers
Atlético Bucaramanga footballers
Santos FC players
Millonarios F.C. players
UA Maracaibo players
Real Cartagena footballers
Colombian expatriate footballers
Expatriate footballers in Brazil
Expatriate footballers in Venezuela
Colombia international footballers
2000 CONCACAF Gold Cup players
2003 FIFA Confederations Cup players
2003 CONCACAF Gold Cup players
2004 Copa América players